Podargus is a small genus of birds in the frogmouth family, Podargidae. All members of this genus are found in Australia, with some species being found in Papua New Guinea, Indonesia, and the Solomon Islands, as well.
It contains these species to date:

 
Bird genera
Taxa named by Louis Jean Pierre Vieillot
Taxonomy articles created by Polbot